Human Cargo  is a 1936 American action film, directed by Allan Dwan and released by 20th Century Fox. It stars Claire Trevor, Brian Donlevy, Alan Dinehart, and Rita Hayworth (credited as Rita Cansino).  Rival reporters team up to catch alien smugglers.

Plot

Cast
 Claire Trevor as Bonnie Brewster
 Brian Donlevy as Packy Campbell
 Alan Dinehart as Lionel Crocker
 Ralph Morgan as District Attorney Carey
 Helen Troy as Susie
 Rita Hayworth as Carmen Zoro
 Morgan Wallace as Gilbert Fender
 Herman Bing as Fritz Schultz
 John McGuire as 'Spike' Davis
 Ralf Harolde as Tony Sculla
 Wade Boteler as Bob McSweeney
 Harry Woods as Ira Conklin
 Wilfred Lucas as Police Chief

References

External links

1936 films
American action films
1930s action films
Films directed by Allan Dwan
American black-and-white films
20th Century Fox films
1930s American films